This is a list of all managers of Foolad.

Coaches

See also
Foolad F.C.
List of Foolad F.C. players

References

Foolad
Foolad